Lorenz Eugene Zimmerman (November 15, 1920 – March 16, 2013) was an American ophthalmologist and an ophthalmic pathologist.

Early life and education 
Zimmerman was born in Washington, D.C. He received his bachelor's degree from George Washington University in 1943 and his M.D. from the George Washington University School of Medicine & Health Sciences in 1945.

Career 
After completing his residency in general pathology at Walter Reed Army Medical Center, he was commissioned in 1950 as commanding officer of the 8217th Mobile Medical Laboratory in Korea. For his wartime service, he received the Bronze Star and the Legion of Merit. In 1952 he was assigned to the Armed Forces Institute of Pathology, where he remained until his retirement in 2002 as emeritus chair of the Institute's department of ophthalmic pathology. He was also an associate professor from 1954 to 1963 and from 1963 a full professor of ophthalmology at George Washington University. From 1983 he was a professor of ophthalmology and pathology at Georgetown University.

Personal life 
Zimmerman died in Towson, Maryland in 2013.

Awards and honors
1976 — Ernst Jung Prize for Medicine of the Jung Foundation for Science and Research
1978 — Donders Medal of the Netherlands Ophthalmological Society
1999 — Helen Keller Prize for Vision Research of the Helen Keller Foundation
1999 — Lucien Howe Medal of the American Ophthalmological Society
2006 — Laureate Recognition Award of the American Academy of Ophthalmology

Selected publications
 with Michael J. Hogan: Ophthalmic Pathology. 2nd edition, Saunders, Philadelphia 1962; 797 pages.

References

External links
The 10 most influential ophthalmologists in the 20th century, squintmaster.com

1920 births
2013 deaths
American ophthalmologists
American pathologists
United States Army personnel of the Korean War
George Washington University School of Medicine & Health Sciences alumni